Uncle Tom's Cabin was a 1918 American silent drama film directed by J. Searle Dawley, produced by Famous Players-Lasky Corporation and distributed by Paramount Pictures under the Famous Players-Lasky name. The film is based on Harriet Beecher Stowe's 1852 novel Uncle Tom's Cabin and George Aiken's eponymous play.

Uncle Tom's Cabin starred Marguerite Clark, who portrayed both Topsy and Little Eva. It is now considered to be a lost film.

Plot
As described in a film magazine, Uncle Tom is an old slave living on George Shelby's plantation in Kentucky.  Along with Uncle Tom, are Eliza and her son Jim Crow.  Shelby is in great debt, and although he doesn't want to, he must sell Uncle Tom and Jim to a slave trader.  Eliza hears that this is happening and decides to run away.  She manages to escape by crossing an icy river despite being chased by bloodhounds.

While this is happening, a farmer named St. Clair and his daughter Eva have decided to visit their old southern family home.  It just happens that Uncle Tom is placed on the same steam boat as St. Clair.  Eva is not in the best state of health, and during the boat ride she falls off.  However, Uncle Tom saves her, and by Eva's request, Uncle Tom is bought by the St. Clair's.  At the St. Clair home Uncle Tom is treated very well and is even brought gifts by Eva.  At one point St. Clair saves a slave named Topsy from a terrible master.

Eva continues to grow more ill, and in a dying wish asks for Uncle Tom to be freed.  St. Clair agrees but shortly after he also dies, so Uncle Tom and a slave named Emelin are sold at auction to Simon Legree.  Legree is a ruthless slave owner, and because of this Emelin and a slave named Cassy decide to run away.  They tell Uncle Tom to come with them but he refuses.  Legree commands Tom to tell him where they have gone but Uncle Tom refuses to tell.  Uncle Tom is beaten nearly to death, but Cassy has actually not yet run away.  She witnesses this brutality and kills Legree as he goes to his room.  Just as Tom is dying, Shelby comes to buy back him, but he is too late and Uncle Tom dies.

Cast
 Marguerite Clark (in blackface) as Little Eva St. Clair / Topsy
 Sam Hardy as Simon Legree
 Jack W. Johnston as Haley
 Florence Carpenter as Eliza Harris
 Frank Losee as Uncle Tom
 Phil Ryley as Marks
 Harry Lee as Jeff
 Walter P. Lewis as Simon Legree  (credited as Walter Lewis)
 Augusta Anderson as Mrs. St. Clair
 Ruby Hoffman as Cassy
 Susanne Willis as Aunt Chloe
 Mrs. Priestly Morrison as Ophelia (credited as Mrs. Priestley Morrison)
 Thomas Carnahan, Jr. as George Shelby Jr.
 Jere Austin as George Harris
 Henry Stanford as Mr. St. Clair

Production notes
The film's star, Marguerite Clark, portrayed both Little Eva and Topsy in the film. In order to present both characters on the screen at the same time, the filmmakers used the process of double exposure.

One important aspect of this movie is the use of blackface and its perception by the actors.  Based on archival records the use of blackface was looked at as an impressive use of makeup.  For instance, Frank Losee at one point had his makeup done while in a hotel and a passerby did not realize he was in fact white.  He commented on this saying, “... one of most cherished memories, because it pays an unconscious tribute to my make-up”.  Likewise, film magazines describe Clark as having impeccable makeup, even saying “Marguerite Clark will fool you with her make-up”.

The early scenes involving Eliza's escape are filmed in New York City and Maine.  This is notably due to the cold climate, as the scenes involved an Eliza being chased by dogs across a frozen river.  One magazine made particular note of the use of real Bloodhounds and Great Danes for this scene.  The boat scene of the movie was filmed in New Orleans, Louisiana.  Famous Players Lasky chartered their own steam boat for these scenes.  It is said that during production, director Dawley had worries of Clark, the star actress, being able to swim properly in the river.  Later, to depict the St. Clairs mansion, filming took place at Jackson Barracks in the Colonel's quarters.  Finally, the slave market was filmed outside of the St. Louis hotel.

In an interview with Losee, he details some notable events about the production.  He noted that working alongside star Marguerite Clark was especially enjoyable.  He also made mention of Clark's swim scene and worried that he may not be able to properly save her from the river as he was supposed to.  He noted that one scene was filmed outside the home of some very old men.  Once the men recognized that they were filming Uncle Tom’s Cabin they began to get angry.  Losee notes that the general reception of the south was very positive, but they just happened to run across a few men that were against the message of the movie.

Reception
Like many American films of the time, Uncle Tom's Cabin was subject to cuts by city and state film censorship boards. For example, the Chicago Board of Censors required cuts of two offensive intertitles, in Reel 1, "A nigger is only a nigger" and, Reel 2, "Do you allow her to embrace niggers that way?"

Despite reviews being polarized, there is an overwhelming consensus towards positive reception.  One critic says, “ drawing power astounded me, it proved a real record breaker."  Another noted that the steamboat and river scenes, some of the most famous moments of the novel, could not have been portrayed more realistically.  Many say that the film's double feature was very well done.  Along those lines, a lot of the praise is pointed towards Marguerite Clark.

See also
List of lost films
List of films featuring slavery

References

External links
 
 
 Lobby card designed for the 1918 film
 Marguerite Clark (in a blond wig as Eva) and Frank Losee (black face as Uncle Tom)
  Marguerite Clark in blackface(archived)
newspaper adverts

1918 films
1918 drama films
Silent American drama films
American silent feature films
American black-and-white films
Blackface minstrel shows and films
Famous Players-Lasky films
Films about American slavery
Films based on American novels
American films based on plays
Films based on works by Harriet Beecher Stowe
Films directed by J. Searle Dawley
Films set in the 1860s
Films shot in Maine
Films shot in New Orleans
Films shot in New York City
Lost American films
Paramount Pictures films
Films based on multiple works
Films based on adaptations
Uncle Tom's Cabin
1918 lost films
Lost drama films
Censored films
African-American-related controversies in film
Race-related controversies in film
1910s American films
1910s English-language films